The R608 road is a regional road in Ireland, located in County Cork and Cork City. It intersects the N22 three times and goes from Cork city centre to Ballincollig via Wilton and Bishopstown.

References

Regional roads in the Republic of Ireland
Roads in County Cork